Peter Sherlock Wyse Jackson (born 7 June 1955) is an Irish botanist and environmentalist. He is president of the Missouri Botanical Garden, and holder of the George Engelmann chair in botany at Washington University in St. Louis.

Early life
Wyse Jackson was born in Kilkenny, Ireland on 7 June 1955 to Robert Wyse Jackson and Lois Margery (née Phair). His father was Bishop of Limerick, Ardfert and Aghadoe and Dean of Cashel.

He grew up with an interest in birds and plants which he indulged on summer holidays to Kerry. While getting his secondary education at St Columba's College, Dublin he was introduced to systematic botany.

Education
Wyse Jackson was educated at Trinity College Dublin, where he took a BA and an MA in botany, and a PhD for work related to the taxonomy of the Cruciferae of Ireland.

In 1980 he became curator of the botanical garden of the college.

Career
In 1994 he was made secretary-general of Botanic Gardens Conservation International, which he had helped to set up. He also worked on the formulation of the Global Strategy for Plant Conservation of the United Nations.

In 2005 he returned to Ireland to become director of the National Botanic Gardens in Glasnevin, Dublin.

2010, Wyse Jackson succeeded Peter Raven as president of the Missouri Botanical Garden in St. Louis, Missouri.  Concurrently with his selection as President of the Missouri Botanical Garden, he was named the George Engelmann Professor of Botany at Washington University in St. Louis.

He has written academic papers on plant conservation, botanic gardens and endangered island flora conservation.

Bibliography

References

External links
 at Missouri Botanical Garden
 at Washington University in St. Louis

1955 births
Living people
20th-century Irish botanists
People from County Kilkenny
Missouri Botanical Garden directors
American nonprofit executives
People educated at St Columba's College, Dublin
Alumni of Trinity College Dublin
Washington University in St. Louis faculty
21st-century Irish botanists